Ihtiman Hook (‘Ihtimanska Kosa’ \ih-ti-'man-ska ko-'sa\) is a gravel barrier spit extending 700 m westward from the north coast of Burgas Peninsula on Livingston Island in the South Shetland Islands, Antarctica.  Situated 2.8 km east-northeast of Rila Point, 5.9 km west of Renier Point, and 1.5 km south of Half Moon Island.

The hook is named after the town of Ihtiman in western Bulgaria.

Location

Bulgarian topographic survey Tangra 2004/05. British mapping in 1968, Chilean in 1971, Argentine in 1980, and Bulgarian in 2005 and 2009.

Map

L.L. Ivanov. Antarctica: Livingston Island and Greenwich, Robert, Snow and Smith Islands. Scale 1:120000 topographic map.  Troyan: Manfred Wörner Foundation, 2009.

References
 Ihtiman Hook. SCAR Composite Gazetteer of Antarctica.
 Bulgarian Antarctic Gazetteer. Antarctic Place-names Commission. (details in Bulgarian, basic data in English)

Landforms of Livingston Island
Bulgaria and the Antarctic
Spits of Antarctica
Ihtiman